Donald John Trump (born June 14, 1946) is an American politician, media personality, and businessman who served as the 45th president of the United States from 2017 to 2021.

Trump graduated from the Wharton School of the University of Pennsylvania with a bachelor's degree in 1968. He became president of his father's real estate business in 1971 and renamed it The Trump Organization. He expanded the company's operations to building and renovating skyscrapers, hotels, casinos, and golf courses and later started side ventures, mostly by licensing his name. From 2004 to 2015, he co-produced and hosted the reality television series The Apprentice. Trump and his businesses have been involved in more than 4,000 state and federal legal actions, including six bankruptcies.

Trump's political positions have been described as populist, protectionist, isolationist, and nationalist. He won the 2016 United States presidential election as the Republican nominee against Democratic nominee Hillary Clinton despite losing the national popular vote. He became the first U.S. president with no prior military or government service. His election and policies sparked numerous protests. The 2017–2019 special counsel investigation established that Russia interfered in the 2016 election to favor the election of Trump. Trump promoted conspiracy theories and made many false and misleading statements during his campaigns and presidency, to a degree unprecedented in American politics. Many of his comments and actions have been characterized as racially charged or racist, and many as misogynistic.

Trump ordered a travel ban on citizens from several Muslim-majority countries, diverted military funding towards building a wall on the U.S.–Mexico border, and implemented a policy of family separations for apprehended migrants. He rolled back more than 100 environmental policies and regulations in an aggressive attempt to weaken environmental protections. Trump signed the Tax Cuts and Jobs Act of 2017 which cut taxes for individuals and businesses and rescinded the individual health insurance mandate penalty of the Affordable Care Act. He appointed 54 federal appellate judges and three United States Supreme Court justices. Trump initiated a trade war with China and withdrew the U.S. from the proposed Trans-Pacific Partnership trade agreement, the Paris Agreement on climate change, and the Iran nuclear deal. Trump met with North Korean leader Kim Jong-un three times, but made no progress on denuclearization. He reacted slowly to the COVID-19 pandemic, ignored or contradicted many recommendations from health officials in his messaging, and promoted misinformation about unproven treatments and the need for testing.

Trump lost the 2020 presidential election to Joe Biden but refused to concede defeat, falsely claiming widespread electoral fraud and attempting to overturn the results by pressuring government officials, mounting scores of unsuccessful legal challenges, and obstructing the presidential transition. On January 6, 2021, Trump urged his supporters to march to the United States Capitol, which many of them then attacked, resulting in multiple deaths and interrupting the electoral vote count.

Trump is the only American president to have been impeached twice. After he tried to pressure Ukraine in 2019 to investigate Biden, he was impeached in December by the House of Representatives for abuse of power and obstruction of Congress and acquitted by the Senate in February 2020. The House impeached Trump a second time in January 2021, for incitement of insurrection, and the Senate acquitted him in February. Since leaving office, Trump has remained heavily involved in the Republican Party, including making over 200 political endorsements during the 2022 midterm elections. In November 2022, he announced his candidacy for the Republican nomination in the 2024 presidential election. In December 2022, the House January 6 Committee recommended criminal charges against Trump for obstructing an official proceeding, conspiracy to defraud the United States, and inciting or assisting an insurrection. Scholars and historians rank Trump as one of the worst presidents in American history.

Personal life

Early life 

Donald John Trump was born on June 14, 1946, at Jamaica Hospital in the borough of Queens in New York City, the fourth child of Fred Trump, a Bronx-born real estate developer whose parents were German immigrants, and Mary Anne MacLeod Trump, an immigrant from Scotland. Trump grew up with older siblings Maryanne, Fred Jr., and Elizabeth, and younger brother Robert in the Jamaica Estates neighborhood of Queens, and attended the private Kew-Forest School from kindergarten through seventh grade. At age 13, he was enrolled at the New York Military Academy, a private boarding school, and in 1964, he enrolled at Fordham University. Two years later, he transferred to the Wharton School of the University of Pennsylvania, graduating in May 1968 with a B.S. in economics. In 2015, Trump's lawyer Michael Cohen threatened Trump's colleges, high school, and the College Board with legal action if they released Trump's academic records.

While in college, Trump obtained four student draft deferments during the Vietnam War era. In 1966, he was deemed fit for military service based upon a medical examination, and in July 1968, a local draft board classified him as eligible to serve. In October 1968, he was classified , a conditional medical deferment, and in 1972, he was reclassified  due to bone spurs, permanently disqualifying him from service.

Family 

In 1977, Trump married Czech model Ivana Zelníčková. They had three children: Donald Jr. (born 1977), Ivanka (born 1981), and Eric (born 1984). Ivana became a naturalized United States citizen in 1988. The couple divorced in 1990, following Trump's affair with actress Marla Maples. Trump and Maples married in 1993 and divorced in 1999. They have one daughter, Tiffany (born 1993), who was raised by Marla in California. In 2005, Trump married Slovenian model Melania Knauss. They have one son, Barron (born 2006). Melania gained U.S. citizenship in 2006.

Religion 
Trump went to Sunday school and was confirmed in 1959 at the First Presbyterian Church in Jamaica, Queens. In the 1970s, his parents joined the Marble Collegiate Church in Manhattan, which belongs to the Reformed Church in America. The pastor at Marble, Norman Vincent Peale, ministered to the family until his death in 1993. Trump has described him as a mentor. In 2015, the church stated that Trump was not an active member. In 2019, he appointed his personal pastor, televangelist Paula White, to the White House Office of Public Liaison. In 2020, he said he identified as a non-denominational Christian.

Health habits 
Trump has called golfing his "primary form of exercise" but usually does not walk the course. He considers exercise a waste of energy, because exercise depletes the body's energy "like a battery, with a finite amount of energy." In 2015, Trump's campaign released a letter from his longtime personal physician, Harold Bornstein, stating that Trump would "be the healthiest individual ever elected to the presidency." In 2018, Bornstein said Trump had dictated the contents of the letter, and that three Trump agents had seized his medical records in a February 2017 raid on the doctor's office.

Wealth 

In 1982, Trump made the initial Forbes list of wealthy people for holding a share of his family's estimated $200 million net worth (equivalent to $ million in ). His losses in the 1980s dropped him from the list between 1990 and 1995. After filing the mandatory financial disclosure report with the FEC in July 2015, he announced a net worth of about $10 billion. Records released by the FEC showed at least $1.4 billion in assets and $265 million in liabilities. Forbes estimated his net worth at $4.5 billion in 2015 and $3.1 billion in 2018. In its 2021 billionaires ranking, it was $2.4 billion (1,299th in the world), making him one of the wealthiest officeholders in American history.

Journalist Jonathan Greenberg reported in 2018 that Trump, using the pseudonym "John Barron" and claiming to be a Trump Organization official, called him in 1984 to falsely assert that he owned "in excess of ninety percent" of the Trump family's business, to secure a higher ranking on the Forbes 400 list of wealthy Americans. Greenberg also wrote that Forbes had vastly overestimated Trump's wealth and wrongly included him on the Forbes 400 rankings of 1982, 1983, and 1984.

Trump has often said he began his career with "a small loan of one million dollars" from his father, and that he had to pay it back with interest. He was a millionaire by age eight, borrowed at least $60 million from his father, largely failed to repay those loans, and received another $413 million (adjusted for inflation) from his father's company. In 2018, he and his family were reported to have committed tax fraud, and the New York State Department of Taxation and Finance began investigating. His investments underperformed the stock and New York property markets. Forbes estimated in October 2018 that his net worth declined from $4.5 billion in 2015 to $3.1 billion in 2017 and his product licensing income from $23 million to $3 million.

Contrary to his claims of financial health and business acumen, Trump's tax returns from 1985 to 1994 show net losses totaling $1.17 billion. The losses were higher than those of almost every other American taxpayer. The losses in 1990 and 1991, more than $250 million each year, were more than double those of the nearest losers. In 1995, his reported losses were $915.7 million (equivalent to $ billion in ).

Over 20 years, Trump lost hundreds of millions of dollars and deferred declaring $287 million in forgiven debt as taxable income. His income mainly came from his share in The Apprentice and businesses in which he was a minority partner, and his losses mainly from majority-owned businesses. Much income was in tax credits for his losses, which let him avoid annual income tax payments or lowered them to $750. In the last decade, he balanced his businesses' losses by selling and borrowing against assets, including a $100 million mortgage on Trump Tower (due in 2022) and the liquidation of over $200 million in stocks and bonds. He personally guaranteed $421 million in debt, most of which is due by 2024.

As of October 2020, Trump had over $1 billion in debts, secured by his assets. He owed $640 million to banks and trust organizations, including Bank of China, Deutsche Bank, and UBS, and approximately $450 million to unknown creditors. The value of his assets exceeds his debt.

Business career

Real estate 

Starting in 1968, Trump was employed at his father Fred's real estate company, Trump Management, which owned middle-class rental housing in New York City's outer boroughs. In 1971, he became president of the company and began using The Trump Organization as an umbrella brand.

Manhattan developments 
Trump attracted public attention in 1978 with the launch of his family's first Manhattan venture, the renovation of the derelict Commodore Hotel, adjacent to Grand Central Terminal. The financing was facilitated by a $400 million city property tax abatement arranged by Fred Trump, who also, jointly with Hyatt, guaranteed a $70 million in bank construction financing. The hotel reopened in 1980 as the Grand Hyatt Hotel, and that same year, Trump obtained rights to develop Trump Tower, a mixed-use skyscraper in Midtown Manhattan. The building houses the headquarters of the Trump Corporation and Trump's PAC and was Trump's primary residence until 2019.

In 1988, Trump acquired the Plaza Hotel in Manhattan with a loan of $425 million (equivalent to $ million in ) from a consortium of banks. Two years later, the hotel filed for bankruptcy protection, and a reorganization plan was approved in 1992. In 1995, Trump sold the Plaza Hotel along with most of his properties to pay down his debts, including personally guaranteed loans, allowing him to avoid personal insolvency.

In 1996, Trump acquired the mostly vacant 71-story skyscraper at 40 Wall Street, later rebranded as the Trump Building, and renovated it. In the early 1990s, Trump won the right to develop a  tract in the Lincoln Square neighborhood near the Hudson River. Struggling with debt from other ventures in 1994, Trump sold most of his interest in the project to Asian investors, who were able to finance completion of the project, Riverside South.

Mar-a-Lago 

In 1985, Trump acquired the Mar-a-Lago estate in Palm Beach, Florida. In 1995, he converted the estate into a private club with an initiation fee and annual dues. He continued to use a wing of the house as a private residence. In 2019, Trump declared Mar-a-Lago his primary residence.

Atlantic City casinos 

In 1984, Trump opened Harrah's at Trump Plaza, a hotel and casino in Atlantic City, New Jersey, with financing and management help from the Holiday Corporation. It was unprofitable, and Trump paid Holiday $70 million in May 1986 to take sole control. Trump had earlier bought a hotel and casino in Atlantic City from the Hilton Corporation for $320 million. On completion in 1985, it became Trump Castle. His wife Ivana managed it until 1988.

Trump bought a third Atlantic City venue in 1988, the Trump Taj Mahal. It was financed with $675 million in junk bonds and completed for $1.1 billion, opening in April 1990. It went bankrupt in 1989. Reorganizing left him with half his initial stake and required him to personally guarantee future performance. To reduce his $900 million of personal debt, he sold his failing Trump Shuttle airline, his megayacht, the Trump Princess, which had been leased to his casinos and kept docked, and other businesses.

In 1995, Trump founded Trump Hotels & Casino Resorts (THCR), which assumed ownership of Trump Plaza, Trump Castle, and the Trump Casino in Gary, Indiana. THCR purchased the Taj Mahal in 1996 and went bankrupt in 2004, 2009, and 2014, leaving Trump with 10 percent ownership. He remained chairman until 2009.

Golf courses 

The Trump Organization began building and buying golf courses in 1999. It owns fourteen and manages another three Trump-branded courses worldwide.

Trump visited a Trump Organization property on 428 (nearly one in three) of the 1,461 days of his presidency and is estimated to have played 261 rounds of golf, one every 5.6 days.

Licensing of the Trump brand 

The Trump name has been licensed for various consumer products and services, including foodstuffs, apparel, adult learning courses, and home furnishings. According to an analysis by The Washington Post, there are more than 50 licensing or management deals involving Trump's name, which have generated at least $59 million in revenue for his companies. By 2018, only two consumer goods companies continued to license his name.

Side ventures 

In September 1983, Trump purchased the New Jersey Generals, a team in the United States Football League. After the 1985 season, the league folded, largely due to Trump's strategy of moving games to a fall schedule (when they competed with the NFL for audience) and trying to force a merger with the NFL by bringing an antitrust suit against the organization.

Trump's businesses have hosted several boxing matches at the Atlantic City Convention Hall adjacent to and promoted as taking place at the Trump Plaza in Atlantic City. In 1989 and 1990, Trump lent his name to the Tour de Trump cycling stage race, which was an attempt to create an American equivalent of European races such as the Tour de France or the Giro d'Italia.

From 1986 to 1988, Trump purchased significant blocks of shares in various public companies while suggesting that he intended to take over the company and then sold his shares for a profit, leading some observers to think he was engaged in greenmail. The New York Times found that Trump initially made millions of dollars in such stock transactions, but later "lost most, if not all, of those gains after investors stopped taking his takeover talk seriously".

In 1988, Trump purchased the Eastern Air Lines Shuttle, with 21 planes and landing rights in New York City, Boston, and Washington, D.C. He financed the purchase with $380 million (equivalent to $ million in ) from 22 banks, rebranded the operation the Trump Shuttle, and operated it until 1992. Trump failed to earn a profit with the airline and sold it to USAir.

In 1992, Trump, his siblings Maryanne, Elizabeth, and Robert, and his cousin John W. Walter, each with a 20 percent share, formed All County Building Supply & Maintenance Corp. The company had no offices and is alleged to have been a shell company for paying the vendors providing services and supplies for Trump's rental units, then billing those services and supplies to Trump Management with markups of 20–50 percent and more. The owners shared the proceeds generated by the markups. The increased costs were used as justification to get state approval for increasing the rents of Trump's rent-stabilized units.

From 1996 to 2015, Trump owned all or part of the Miss Universe pageants, including Miss USA and Miss Teen USA. Due to disagreements with CBS about scheduling, he took both pageants to NBC in 2002. In 2007, Trump received a star on the Hollywood Walk of Fame for his work as producer of Miss Universe. NBC and Univision dropped the pageants from their broadcasting lineups in June 2015.

Trump University 

In 2004, Trump co-founded Trump University, a company that sold real estate training courses priced from $1,500 to $35,000. After New York State authorities notified the company that its use of the word "university" violated state law (as it was not an academic institution), its name was changed to Trump Entrepreneur Initiative in 2010.

In 2013, the State of New York filed a $40 million civil suit against Trump University, alleging that the company made false statements and defrauded consumers. In addition, two class actions were filed in federal court against Trump and his companies. Internal documents revealed that employees were instructed to use a hard-sell approach, and former employees testified that Trump University had defrauded or lied to its students. Shortly after he won the 2016 presidential election, Trump agreed to pay a total of $25 million to settle the three cases.

Foundation 

The Donald J. Trump Foundation was a private foundation established in 1988. In the foundation's final years its funds mostly came from donors other than Trump, who did not donate any personal funds to the charity from 2009 until 2014. The foundation gave to health care and sports-related charities, as well as conservative groups.

In 2016, The Washington Post reported that the charity had committed several potential legal and ethical violations, including alleged self-dealing and possible tax evasion. Also in 2016, the New York State attorney general's office said the foundation appeared to be in violation of New York laws regarding charities and ordered it to immediately cease its fundraising activities in New York. Trump's team announced in December 2016 that the foundation would be dissolved.

In June 2018, the New York attorney general's office filed a civil suit against the foundation, Trump, and his adult children, seeking $2.8 million in restitution and additional penalties. In December 2018, the foundation ceased operation and disbursed all its assets to other charities. In November 2019, a New York state judge ordered Trump to pay $2 million to a group of charities for misusing the foundation's funds, in part to finance his presidential campaign.

Legal affairs and bankruptcies 

Fixer Roy Cohn served as Trump's lawyer and mentor for 13 years in the 1970s and 1980s. According to Trump, Cohn sometimes waived fees due to their friendship. In 1973, Cohn helped Trump countersue the United States government for $100 million (equivalent to $ million in ) over its charges that Trump's properties had racial discriminatory practices. Trump and Cohn lost that case when the countersuit was dismissed and the government's case went forward. In 1975, an agreement was struck requiring Trump's properties to furnish the New York Urban League with a list of all apartment vacancies, every week for two years, among other things. Cohn introduced political consultant Roger Stone to Trump, who enlisted Stone's services to deal with the federal government.

, Trump and his businesses had been involved in more than 4,000 state and federal legal actions, according to a running tally by USA Today.

While Trump has not filed for personal bankruptcy, his over-leveraged hotel and casino businesses in Atlantic City and New York filed for Chapter 11 bankruptcy protection six times between 1991 and 2009. They continued to operate while the banks restructured debt and reduced Trump's shares in the properties.

During the 1980s, more than 70 banks had lent Trump $4 billion, but in the aftermath of his corporate bankruptcies of the early 1990s, most major banks declined to lend to him, with only Deutsche Bank still willing to lend money. After the January 6 United States Capitol attack, the bank decided not to do business with Trump or his company in the future.

Media career

Books 

Using ghostwriters, Trump has produced up to 19 books on business, financial, or political topics under his name. His first book, The Art of the Deal (1987), was a New York Times Best Seller. While Trump was credited as co-author, the entire book was written by Tony Schwartz. According to The New Yorker, "The book expanded Trump's renown far beyond New York City, making him an emblem of the successful tycoon." Trump has called the volume his second favorite book, after the Bible.

Film and television 

Trump made cameo appearances in many films and television shows from 1985 to 2001.

Trump had a sporadic relationship with the professional wrestling promotion WWE since the late 1980s. He appeared at WrestleMania 23 in 2007 and was inducted into the celebrity wing of the WWE Hall of Fame in 2013.

Starting in the 1990s, Trump was a guest about 24 times on the nationally syndicated Howard Stern Show. He also had his own short-form talk radio program called Trumped! (one to two minutes on weekdays) from 2004 to 2008. From 2011 until 2015, he was a weekly unpaid guest commentator on Fox & Friends.

From 2004 to 2015, Trump was co-producer and host of reality shows The Apprentice and The Celebrity Apprentice. On The Apprentice, Trump played the role of a chief executive, and contestants competed for a year of employment at the Trump Organization. On The Celebrity Apprentice, celebrities competed to win money for charities. On both shows, Trump eliminated contestants with the catchphrase "You're fired."

Trump, who had been a member since 1989, resigned from the Screen Actors Guild in February 2021 rather than face a disciplinary committee hearing for inciting the January 6, 2021, mob attack on the U.S. Capitol and for his "reckless campaign of misinformation aimed at discrediting and ultimately threatening the safety of journalists." Two days later, the union permanently barred him from readmission.

Internet 
Trump registered a new company in February 2021. Trump Media & Technology Group (TMTG) was formed for providing "social networking services" to "customers in the United States". In October 2021, Trump announced the planned merger of TMTG with Digital World Acquisition, a special-purpose acquisition company (SPAC). A main backer of the SPAC is China-based financier ARC Group, who was reportedly involved in setting up the proposed merger. The transaction is under investigation by the U.S. Securities and Exchange Commission. In February 2022, TMTG launched Truth Social, a Twitter-like social media platform.

Political career 

Trump's political party affiliation has changed numerous times. He registered as a Republican in 1987, a member of the Independence Party, the New York state affiliate of the Reform Party, in 1999, a Democrat in 2001, a Republican in 2009, unaffiliated in 2011, and a Republican in 2012.

In 1987, Trump placed full-page advertisements in three major newspapers, expressing his views on foreign policy and on how to eliminate the federal budget deficit. He ruled out running for local office but not for the presidency. In 1988, he approached Lee Atwater asking to be put into consideration as Republican nominee George H. W. Bush's running mate. Bush found the request "strange and unbelievable".

Presidential campaigns (2000–2016) 

In 2000, Trump ran in the California and Michigan primaries for nomination as the Reform Party candidate for the 2000 United States presidential election but withdrew from the race in February 2000. A July 1999 poll matching him against likely Republican nominee George W. Bush and likely Democratic nominee Al Gore showed Trump with seven percent support.

In 2011, Trump speculated about running against President Barack Obama in the 2012 election, making his first speaking appearance at the Conservative Political Action Conference (CPAC) in February 2011 and giving speeches in early primary states. In May 2011, he announced he would not run, and he endorsed Mitt Romney in February 2012. Trump's presidential ambitions were generally not taken seriously at the time.

2016 presidential campaign 

Trump's fame and provocative statements earned him an unprecedented amount of free media coverage, elevating his standing in the Republican primaries. He adopted the phrase "truthful hyperbole", coined by his ghostwriter Tony Schwartz, to describe his public speaking style. His campaign statements were often opaque and suggestive, and a record number of them were false. The Los Angeles Times wrote, "Never in modern presidential politics has a major candidate made false statements as routinely as Trump has." Trump said he disdained political correctness and frequently made claims of media bias.

Trump announced his candidacy in June 2015. His campaign was initially not taken seriously by political analysts, but he quickly rose to the top of opinion polls. He became the front-runner in March 2016 and was declared the presumptive Republican nominee in May.

Hillary Clinton led Trump in national polling averages throughout the campaign, but in early July her lead narrowed. In mid-July Trump selected Indiana governor Mike Pence as his vice presidential running mate, and the two were officially nominated at the 2016 Republican National Convention.
Trump and Clinton faced off in three presidential debates in September and October 2016. Trump twice refused to say whether he would accept the result of the election.

Campaign rhetoric and political positions 

Trump's political positions and rhetoric were right-wing populist. Politico described them as "eclectic, improvisational and often contradictory", quoting a health care policy expert at the American Enterprise Institute as saying that his political positions were "a total random assortment of whatever plays publicly." NBC News counted "141 distinct shifts on 23 major issues" during his campaign.

Trump's campaign platform emphasized renegotiating U.S.–China relations and free trade agreements such as NAFTA and the Trans-Pacific Partnership, strongly enforcing immigration laws, and building a new wall along the U.S.–Mexico border. Other campaign positions included pursuing energy independence while opposing climate change regulations such as the Clean Power Plan and the Paris Agreement, modernizing and expediting services for veterans, repealing and replacing the Affordable Care Act, abolishing Common Core education standards, investing in infrastructure, simplifying the tax code while reducing taxes for all economic classes, and imposing tariffs on imports by companies that offshore jobs. He advocated a largely non-interventionist approach to foreign policy while increasing military spending, extreme vetting or banning immigrants from Muslim-majority countries to pre-empt domestic Islamic terrorism, and aggressive military action against the Islamic State of Iraq and the Levant. He described NATO as "obsolete".

Trump helped bring far-right fringe ideas, beliefs, and organizations into the mainstream. Trump was slow to disavow an endorsement from David Duke after he was questioned about it during a CNN interview on February 28, 2016. Duke enthusiastically supported Trump and said he and like-minded people voted for Trump because of his promises to "take our country back". In August 2016, Trump hired Steve Bannon, the executive chairman of Breitbart News—described by Bannon as "the platform for the alt-right"—as his campaign CEO. The alt-right movement coalesced around and supported Trump's candidacy, due in part to its opposition to multiculturalism and immigration. In an interview after the election, Trump said of the alt-right that he did not want to "energize the group" and that he disavowed them.

Financial disclosures 

Trump's FEC-required reports listed assets above $1.4 billion and outstanding debts of at least $315 million.
Trump did not release his tax returns, contrary to the practice of every major candidate since 1976 and his promises in 2014 and 2015 to do so if he ran for office. He said his tax returns were being audited, and his lawyers had advised him against releasing them. After a lengthy court battle to block release of his tax returns and other records to the Manhattan district attorney for a criminal investigation, including two appeals by Trump to the United States Supreme Court, in February 2021 the high court allowed the records to be released to the prosecutor for review by a grand jury.

In October 2016, portions of Trump's state filings for 1995 were leaked to a reporter from The New York Times. They show that Trump had declared a loss of $916 million that year, which could have let him avoid taxes for up to 18 years.

Election to the presidency 

On November 8, 2016, Trump received 306 pledged electoral votes versus 232 for Clinton. The official counts were 304 and 227 respectively, after defections on both sides. Trump received nearly 2.9 million fewer popular votes than Clinton, which made him the fifth person to be elected president while losing the popular vote. Trump is the only president who neither served in the military nor held any government office prior to becoming president.

Trump's victory was a political upset. Polls had consistently shown Clinton with a nationwide—though diminishing—lead, as well as an advantage in most of the competitive states. Trump's support had been modestly underestimated, while Clinton's had been overestimated.

Trump won 30 states; included were Michigan, Pennsylvania, and Wisconsin, which had been part of what was considered a blue wall of Democratic strongholds since the 1990s. Clinton won 20 states and the District of Columbia. Trump's victory marked the return of an undivided Republican government—a Republican White House combined with Republican control of both chambers of Congress.

Trump's election victory sparked protests in major U.S. cities in the days following the election. On the day after Trump's inauguration, an estimated 2.6 million people worldwide, including an estimated half million in Washington, D.C., protested against Trump in the Women's Marches.

Presidency (2017–2021)

Early actions 

Trump was inaugurated on January 20, 2017. During his first week in office, he signed six executive orders: interim procedures in anticipation of repealing the Affordable Care Act ("Obamacare"), withdrawal from the Trans-Pacific Partnership negotiations, reinstatement of the Mexico City policy, authorizing the Keystone XL and Dakota Access Pipeline construction projects, reinforcing border security, and beginning the planning and design process to construct a wall along the U.S. border with Mexico.

Trump's daughter Ivanka and son-in-law Jared Kushner became his assistant and senior advisor, respectively.

Conflicts of interest 

Before being inaugurated, Trump moved his businesses into a revocable trust run by his sons, Eric and Donald Jr, and a business associate. He continued to profit from his businesses and to know how his administration's policies affected his businesses. Though Trump said he would eschew "new foreign deals", the Trump Organization pursued expansions of its operations in Dubai, Scotland, and the Dominican Republic.

Trump was sued for violating the Domestic and Foreign Emoluments Clauses of the U.S. Constitution, marking the first time that the clauses had been substantively litigated. The plaintiffs said that Trump's business interests could allow foreign governments to influence him. After Trump's term had ended, the U.S. Supreme Court dismissed the cases as moot.

Domestic policy

Economy 

Trump took office at the height of the longest economic expansion in American history, which began in June 2009 and continued until February 2020, when the COVID-19 recession began.

In December 2017, Trump signed the Tax Cuts and Jobs Act of 2017. The bill had been passed by both Republican-controlled chambers of Congress without any Democratic votes. It reduced tax rates for businesses and individuals, with business tax cuts to be permanent and individual tax cuts set to expire after 2025, and eliminated the Affordable Care Act's individual requirement to obtain health insurance. The Trump administration claimed that the act would either increase tax revenues or pay for itself by prompting economic growth. Instead, revenues in 2018 were 7.6 percent lower than projected.

Despite a campaign promise to eliminate the national debt in eight years, Trump approved large increases in government spending and the 2017 tax cut. As a result, the federal budget deficit increased by almost 50%, to nearly $1 trillion in 2019. Under Trump, the U.S. national debt increased by 39 percent, reaching $27.75trillion by the end of his term; the U.S. debt-to-GDP ratio also hit a post-World War II high. Trump also failed to deliver the $1 trillion infrastructure spending plan on which he had campaigned.

Trump is the only modern U.S. president to leave office with a smaller workforce than when he took office, by 3 million people.

Climate change, environment, and energy 

Trump rejects the scientific consensus on climate change. He reduced the budget for renewable energy research by 40% and reversed Obama-era policies directed at curbing climate change. In June 2017, Trump announced the withdrawal of the United States from the Paris Agreement, making the U.S. the only nation in the world to not ratify the agreement.

Trump aimed to boost the production and exports of fossil fuels. Natural gas expanded under Trump, but coal continued to decline.
Trump rolled back more than 100 federal environmental regulations, including those that curbed greenhouse gas emissions, air and water pollution, and the use of toxic substances. He weakened protections for animals and environmental standards for federal infrastructure projects, and expanded permitted areas for drilling and resource extraction, such as allowing drilling in the Arctic Refuge.  Trumps actions while president have been called "a very aggressive attempt to rewrite our laws and reinterpret the meaning of environmental protections."

Deregulation 
In January 2017, Trump signed Executive Order 13771, which directed that for every new regulation federal agencies "identify" two existing regulations for elimination but did not require elimination. He dismantled many federal regulations on health, labor, and the environment, among other topics. Trump signed 14 Congressional Review Act resolutions repealing federal regulations, among them a bill that made it easier for severely mentally ill persons to buy guns. During his first six weeks in office, he delayed, suspended or reversed ninety federal regulations, often "made after requests by the regulated industries." The Institute for Policy Integrity found that 78% of Trump's proposals were blocked by courts or did not prevail over litigation.

Defenders of the administrative state said it exists "to protect those who would otherwise be at the mercy of better-organized, better-funded interests."

Health care 
During his campaign, Trump vowed to repeal and replace the Affordable Care Act (ACA). In office, he scaled back the Act's implementation through executive orders 13765 and 13813. Trump expressed a desire to "let Obamacare fail"; his administration cut the ACA enrollment period in half and drastically reduced funding for advertising and other ways to encourage enrollment. Trump falsely claimed he saved the coverage of pre-existing conditions provided by the ACA. In June 2018, the Trump administration joined 18 Republican-led states in arguing before the Supreme Court that the elimination of the individual mandate had rendered the ACA unconstitutional. If they had succeeded, it would have eliminated health insurance coverage for up to 23 million Americans. During the 2016 campaign, Trump promised to protect funding for Medicare and other social safety-net programs, but in January 2020, he suggested he was willing to consider cuts to such programs.

In response to the opioid epidemic, Trump signed legislation in 2018 to increase funding for drug treatments, but was widely criticized for failing to make a concrete strategy. U.S. opioid overdose deaths declined slightly in 2018, but surged to a record 50,052 deaths in 2019.

Social issues 

Trump said in 2016 that he was committed to appointing "pro-life" justices, pledging to appoint justices who would "automatically" overturn Roe v. Wade. He also said he supported "traditional marriage" but considered the nationwide legality of same-sex marriage a "settled" issue; in March 2017, his administration rolled back key components of the Obama administration's workplace protections against discrimination of LGBT people.

Trump said he is opposed to gun control in general, although his views have shifted over time. After several mass shootings during his term, he said he would propose legislation to curtail gun violence, but this was abandoned in November 2019. His administration took an anti-marijuana position, revoking Obama-era policies that provided protections for states that legalized marijuana.

Trump is a long-time advocate of capital punishment. Under his administration, the federal government executed 13 prisoners, more than in the previous 56 years combined and after a 17-year moratorium. In 2016, Trump said he supported the use of interrogation torture methods such as waterboarding but later appeared to recant this due to the opposition of Defense Secretary James Mattis.

Pardons and commutations 

Most of Trump's pardons and commutations were granted to people with personal or political connections to him. In his term, Trump sidestepped regular Department of Justice procedures for considering pardons; instead, he often entertained pardon requests from his associates or from celebrities.

From 2017 to 2019, the pardons included former Arizona sheriff Joe Arpaio; former Navy sailor Kristian Saucier, who was convicted of taking classified photographs of classified areas inside a submarine; and right-wing commentator Dinesh D'Souza. Following a request by celebrity Kim Kardashian, Trump commuted the life sentence of Alice Marie Johnson, who had been convicted of drug trafficking. Trump pardoned or reversed the sentences of three American servicemen convicted or accused of committing war crimes in Afghanistan or Iraq.

In November and December 2020, Trump pardoned four Blackwater private security contractors convicted of killing Iraqi civilians in the 2007 Nisour Square massacre; white-collar criminals Michael Milken and Bernard Kerik; and daughter Ivanka's father-in-law Charles Kushner. He also pardoned five people convicted as a result of investigations into Russian interference in the 2016 presidential elections: Michael Flynn, George Papadopoulos, Alex van der Zwaan, Stone, whose 40-month sentence for lying to Congress, witness tampering, and obstruction he had already commuted in July, and Paul Manafort.

In his last full day in office, Trump granted 143 pardons and commutations; those receiving pardons include Steve Bannon, Trump fundraiser Elliott Broidy and three former Republican congressmen. Amongst those to receive sentence commutation were former Detroit mayor and Democrat Kwame Kilpatrick and sports gambler Billy Walters; the latter had paid tens of thousands of dollars to former Trump attorney John M. Dowd to plead his case with Trump.

Lafayette Square protester removal and photo op 

On June 1, 2020, federal law enforcement officials used batons, rubber bullets, pepper spray projectiles, stun grenades, and smoke to remove a largely peaceful crowd of protesters from Lafayette Square, outside the White House. Trump then walked to St. John's Episcopal Church, where protesters had set a small fire the night before; he posed for photographs holding a Bible, with senior administration officials later joining him in photos. Trump said on June 3 that the protesters were cleared because "they tried to burn down the church [on May 31] and almost succeeded", describing the church as "badly hurt".

Religious leaders condemned the treatment of protesters and the photo opportunity itself. Many retired military leaders and defense officials condemned Trump's proposal to use the U.S. military against anti-police brutality protesters. The chairman of the Joint Chiefs of Staff, General Mark A. Milley, later apologized for accompanying Trump on the walk and thereby "creat[ing] the perception of the military involved in domestic politics".

Immigration 

Trump's proposed immigration policies were a topic of bitter and contentious debate during the campaign. He promised to build a wall on the Mexico–United States border to restrict illegal movement and vowed Mexico would pay for it. He pledged to deport millions of illegal immigrants residing in the United States, and criticized birthright citizenship for incentivizing "anchor babies". As president, he frequently described illegal immigration as an "invasion" and conflated immigrants with the criminal gang MS-13, though available research shows undocumented immigrants have a lower crime rate than native-born Americans.

Trump attempted to drastically escalate immigration enforcement, including implementing harsher immigration enforcement policies against asylum seekers from Central America than any modern U.S. president.

From 2018 onward, Trump deployed nearly 6,000 troops to the U.S.–Mexico border, to stop most Central American migrants from seeking U.S. asylum, and from 2020 used the public charge rule to restrict immigrants using government benefits from getting permanent residency via green cards. Trump has reduced the number of refugees admitted into the U.S. to record lows. When Trump took office, the annual limit was 110,000; Trump set a limit of 18,000 in the 2020 fiscal year and 15,000 in the 2021 fiscal year. Additional restrictions implemented by the Trump administration caused significant bottlenecks in processing refugee applications, resulting in fewer refugees accepted compared to the allowed limits.

Travel ban 

Following the 2015 San Bernardino attack, Trump proposed to ban Muslim foreigners from entering the United States until stronger vetting systems could be implemented. He later reframed the proposed ban to apply to countries with a "proven history of terrorism".

On January 27, 2017, Trump signed Executive Order 13769, which suspended admission of refugees for 120 days and denied entry to citizens of Iraq, Iran, Libya, Somalia, Sudan, Syria, and Yemen for 90 days, citing security concerns. The order took effect immediately and without warning, causing confusion and chaos at airports. Protests against the ban began at airports the next day. Legal challenges to the order resulted in nationwide preliminary injunctions. A March 6 revised order, which excluded Iraq and gave other exemptions, again was blocked by federal judges in three states. In a decision in June 2017, the Supreme Court ruled that the ban could be enforced on visitors who lack a "credible claim of a bona fide relationship with a person or entity in the United States".

The temporary order was replaced by Presidential Proclamation 9645 on September 24, 2017, which restricted travel from the originally targeted countries except Iraq and Sudan, and further banned travelers from North Korea and Chad, along with certain Venezuelan officials. After lower courts partially blocked the new restrictions, the Supreme Court allowed the September version to go into full effect on December 4, 2017, and ultimately upheld the travel ban in a June 2019 ruling.

Family separation at border 

The Trump administration separated more than 5,400 children of migrant families from their parents at the U.S.–Mexico border while attempting to enter the U.S, a sharp increase in the number of family separations at the border starting from the summer of 2017. In April 2018, the Trump administration announced a "zero tolerance" policy whereby every adult suspected of illegal entry would be criminally prosecuted. This resulted in family separations, as the migrant adults were put in criminal detention for prosecution, while their children were separated as unaccompanied alien minors. Administration officials described the policy as a way to deter illegal immigration.

The policy of family separations was unprecedented in previous administrations and sparked public outrage. Trump falsely asserted that his administration was merely following the law, blaming Democrats, despite the separations being his administration's policy.

Although Trump originally argued that the separations could not be stopped by an executive order, he signed an executive order on June 20, 2018, mandating that migrant families be detained together, unless the administration judged that doing so would harm the child. On June 26, 2018, a federal judge concluded that the Trump administration had "no system in place to keep track of" the separated children, nor any effective measures for family communication and reunification; the judge ordered for the families to be reunited, and family separations stopped, except where the parent(s) are judged unfit to take care of the child, or if there is parental approval. Despite the federal court order, the Trump administration continued to practice family separations, with more than a thousand migrant children separated.

Trump wall and government shutdown 

One of Trump's central campaign promises was to build a  border wall to Mexico and have Mexico pay for it.

In 2018, Trump refused to extend government funding unless Congress allocated $5.6 billion in funds for the border wall, resulting in the federal government partially shutting down for 35 days from December 2018 to January 2019, the longest U.S. government shutdown in history. Around 800,000 government employees were furloughed or worked without pay. Trump and Congress ended the shutdown by approving temporary funding that provided delayed payments to government workers but no funds for the wall. The shutdown resulted in an estimated permanent loss of $3 billion to the economy, according to the Congressional Budget Office. About half of those polled blamed Trump for the shutdown, and Trump's approval ratings dropped.

Trump also declared a National Emergency Concerning the Southern Border of the United States, intending to divert $6.1 billion of funds Congress had allocated to other purposes. Trump vetoed a joint resolution to overturn the declaration, and the Senate voted against a veto override. Legal challenges to the diversion of $2.5 billion originally meant for the Department of Defense's drug interdiction efforts and $3.6 billion originally meant for military construction

Foreign policy 

Trump described himself as a "nationalist" and his foreign policy as "America First". He espoused isolationist, non-interventionist, and protectionist views. His foreign policy was marked by praise and support of populist, neo-nationalist and authoritarian governments. Hallmarks of foreign relations during Trump's tenure included unpredictability and uncertainty, a lack of a consistent foreign policy, and strained and sometimes antagonistic relationships with the U.S.'s European allies.

Trump questioned the need for NATO, criticized the U.S.'s NATO allies, and privately suggested on multiple occasions that the United States should withdraw from the alliance.

Trade 

Trump is a skeptic of trade liberalization, adopting these views in the 1980s, and sharply criticized NAFTA during the Republican primary campaign in 2015. He withdrew the U.S. from the Trans-Pacific Partnership (TPP) negotiations, imposed tariffs on steel and aluminum imports, and launched a trade war with China by sharply increasing tariffs on 818 categories (worth $50 billion) of Chinese goods imported into the U.S. While Trump said that import tariffs are paid by China into the U.S. Treasury, they are paid by American companies that import goods from China. Although he pledged during the campaign to significantly reduce the U.S.'s large trade deficits, the trade deficit in July 2020, during the COVID-19 pandemic, "was the largest monthly deficit since July 2008". Following a 2017–2018 renegotiation, the United States-Mexico-Canada Agreement (USMCA) became effective in July 2020 as the successor to NAFTA.

Russia 

The Trump administration "water[ed] down the toughest penalties the U.S. had imposed on Russian entities" after its 2014 annexation of Crimea. Trump withdrew the U.S. from the Intermediate-Range Nuclear Forces Treaty, citing alleged Russian non-compliance, and supported a potential return of Russia to the G7.

Trump repeatedly praised and rarely criticized Russian president Vladimir Putin, but opposed some actions of the Russian government. After he met Putin at the Helsinki Summit in July 2018, Trump drew bipartisan criticism for accepting Putin's denial of Russian interference in the 2016 presidential election, rather than accepting the findings of U.S. intelligence agencies. Trump did not discuss alleged Russian bounties offered to Taliban fighters for attacking American soldiers in Afghanistan with Putin, saying both that he doubted the intelligence and that he was not briefed on it.

China 
Before and during his presidency, Trump repeatedly accused China of taking unfair advantage of the U.S. As president, Trump launched a trade war against China that was widely characterized as a failure; sanctioned Huawei for its alleged ties to Iran; significantly increased visa restrictions on Chinese students and scholars; and classified China as a currency manipulator. Trump also juxtaposed verbal attacks on China with praise of Chinese Communist Party leader Xi Jinping, which was attributed to trade war negotiations with the leader. After initially praising China for its handling of the COVID-19 pandemic, he began a campaign of criticism over its response starting in March 2020.

Trump said he resisted punishing China for its human rights abuses against ethnic minorities in the northwestern Xinjiang region for fear of jeopardizing trade negotiations. In July 2020, the Trump administration imposed sanctions and visa restrictions against senior Chinese officials, in response to expanded mass detention camps holding more than a million of the country's Uyghur Muslim ethnic minority.

North Korea 

In 2017, when North Korea's nuclear weapons were increasingly seen as a serious threat, Trump escalated his rhetoric, warning that North Korean aggression would be met with "fire and fury like the world has never seen". In 2017, Trump declared that he wanted North Korea's "complete denuclearization", and engaged in name-calling with leader Kim Jong-un.

After this period of tension, Trump and Kim exchanged at least 27 letters in which the two men described a warm personal friendship. Trump met Kim three times: in Singapore in 2018, in Hanoi in 2019, and in the Korean Demilitarized Zone in 2019. Trump became the first sitting U.S. president to meet a North Korean leader or to set foot on North Korean soil. Trump also lifted some U.S. sanctions against North Korea.

However, no denuclearization agreement was reached, and talks in October 2019 broke down after one day. While conducting no nuclear tests since 2017, North Korea continued to build up its arsenal of nuclear weapons and ballistic missiles.

Afghanistan 

U.S. troop numbers in Afghanistan increased from 8,500 in January 2017 to 14,000 a year later, reversing Trump's pre-election position critical of further involvement in Afghanistan. In February 2020, the Trump administration signed a conditional peace agreement with the Taliban, which called for the withdrawal of foreign troops in 14 months "contingent on a guarantee from the Taliban that Afghan soil will not be used by terrorists with aims to attack the United States or its allies" and for the U.S. to seek the release of 5,000 Taliban imprisoned by the Afghan government. By the end of Trump's term, 5,000 Taliban had been released, and, despite the Taliban continuing attacks on Afghan forces and integrating Al-Qaeda members into its leadership, U.S. troops had been reduced to 2,500.

Israel 
Trump supported many of the policies of Israeli Prime Minister Benjamin Netanyahu. Under Trump, the U.S. recognized Jerusalem as the capital of Israel and Israeli sovereignty over the Golan Heights, leading to international condemnation including from the United Nations General Assembly, the European Union, and the Arab League.

Saudi Arabia 
Trump actively supported the Saudi Arabian–led intervention in Yemen against the Houthis and in 2017 signed a $110 billion agreement to sell arms to Saudi Arabia, In 2018, the USA provided limited intelligence and logistical support for the intervention. Following the 2019 attack on Saudi oil facilities, which the U.S. and Saudi Arabia blamed on Iran, Trump approved the deployment of 3,000 additional U.S. troops, including fighter squadrons, two Patriot batteries, and a Terminal High Altitude Area Defense system (THAAD), to Saudi Arabia and the United Arab Emirates.

Syria 
Trump ordered missile strikes in April 2017 and in April 2018 against the Assad regime in Syria, in retaliation for the Khan Shaykhun and Douma chemical attacks, respectively.

In December 2018, Trump declared "we have won against ISIS," contradicting Department of Defense assessments, and ordered the withdrawal of all troops from Syria. The next day, Mattis resigned in protest, calling his decision an abandonment of the U.S.'s Kurdish allies who played a key role in fighting ISIS. One week after his announcement, Trump said he would not approve any extension of the American deployment in Syria.

In October 2019, after Trump spoke to Turkish president Recep Tayyip Erdoğan, U.S. troops in northern Syria were withdrawn from the area and Turkey invaded northern Syria, attacking and displacing American-allied Kurds in the area. Later that month, the U.S. House of Representatives, in a rare bipartisan vote of 354 to 60, condemned Trump's withdrawal of U.S. troops from Syria, for "abandoning U.S. allies, undermining the struggle against ISIS, and spurring a humanitarian catastrophe".

Iran 
After an Iranian missile test on January 29, 2017, and Houthi attacks on Saudi warships, the Trump administration sanctioned 12 companies and 13 individuals suspected of being involved in Iran's missile program. In May 2018, Trump withdrew the United States from the Joint Comprehensive Plan of Action (JCPOA), the 2015 agreement between Iran, the U.S., and five other countries that lifted most economic sanctions against Iran in return for Iran agreeing to restrictions on its nuclear program. Analysts determined Iran moved closer to developing a nuclear weapon since the withdrawal.

In January 2020, Trump ordered a U.S. airstrike that killed Iranian general  Qasem Soleimani, who had planned nearly every significant operation  by Iranian forces over the past two decades. Trump threatened to hit 52 Iranian sites, including some "important to Iran & the Iranian culture", if Iran retaliated. The threat to hit cultural sites was seen as illegal and both Defense Secretary Mark Esper and Secretary of State Mike Pompeo said that the U.S. would not attack such sites, but would "follow the laws of armed conflict" and "behave inside the system". Iran did retaliate with ballistic missile strikes against two U.S. airbases in Iraq. On the same day, amid the heightened tensions between the United States and Iran, Iran accidentally shot down Ukraine International Airlines Flight 752 after takeoff from Tehran airport.

In August 2020, the Trump administration unsuccessfully attempted to trigger a mechanism that was part of the agreement that would have led to the return of U.N. sanctions against Iran.

Personnel 

The Trump administration had a high turnover of personnel, particularly among White House staff. By the end of Trump's first year in office, 34 percent of his original staff had resigned, been fired, or been reassigned. , 61 percent of Trump's senior aides had left and 141 staffers had left in the previous year. Both figures set a record for recent presidents—more change in the first 13 months than his four immediate predecessors saw in their first two years. Notable early departures included National Security Advisor Flynn (after just 25 days in office), and Press Secretary Sean Spicer. Close personal aides to Trump including Bannon, Hope Hicks, John McEntee, and Keith Schiller quit or were forced out. Some, including Hicks and McEntee, later returned to the White House in different posts. Trump publicly disparaged several of his former top officials, calling them incompetent, stupid, or crazy.

Trump had four White House chiefs of staff, marginalizing or pushing out several. Reince Priebus was replaced after seven months by retired Marine general John F. Kelly. Kelly resigned in December 2018 after a tumultuous tenure in which his influence waned, and Trump subsequently disparaged him. Kelly was succeeded by Mick Mulvaney as acting chief of staff; he was replaced in March 2020 by Mark Meadows.

On May 9, 2017, Trump dismissed FBI director James Comey. While initially attributing this action to Comey's conduct in the investigation about Hillary Clinton's emails, Trump said a few days later that he was concerned with Comey's roles in the ongoing Trump-Russia investigations, and that he had intended to fire Comey earlier. At a private conversation in February, Trump said he hoped Comey would drop the investigation into Flynn. In March and April, Trump asked Comey to "lift the cloud impairing his ability to act" by saying publicly that the FBI was not investigating him.

Two of Trump's 15 original cabinet members were gone within 15 months. Health and Human Services secretary Tom Price was forced to resign in September 2017 due to excessive use of private charter jets and military aircraft. Environmental Protection Agency administrator Scott Pruitt resigned in 2018 and Secretary of the Interior Ryan Zinke in January 2019 amid multiple investigations into their conduct.

Trump was slow to appoint second-tier officials in the executive branch, saying many of the positions are unnecessary. In October 2017, there were still hundreds of sub-cabinet positions without a nominee. By January 8, 2019, of 706 key positions, 433 had been filled (61 percent) and Trump had no nominee for 264 (37 percent).

Judiciary 

Trump appointed 226 Article III judges, including 54 to the courts of appeals and three to the Supreme Court: Neil Gorsuch, Brett Kavanaugh, and Amy Coney Barrett.

As president, Trump disparaged courts and judges whom he disagreed with, often in personal terms, and questioned the judiciary's constitutional authority. Trump's attacks on the courts have drawn rebukes from observers, including sitting federal judges, who are concerned about the effect of Trump's statements on the judicial independence and public confidence in the judiciary.

COVID-19 pandemic 

In December 2019, COVID-19 erupted in Wuhan, China; the SARS-CoV-2 virus spread worldwide within weeks. The first confirmed case in the U.S. was reported on January 20, 2020. The outbreak was officially declared a public health emergency by Health and Human Services (HHS) Secretary Alex Azar on January 31, 2020.

Trump's public statements on COVID-19 were at odds with his private statements. In February 2020 Trump publicly asserted that the outbreak in the U.S. was less deadly than influenza, was "very much under control", and would soon be over. At the same time he acknowledged the opposite in a private conversation with Bob Woodward. In March 2020, Trump privately told Woodward that he was deliberately "playing it down" in public so as not to create panic.

Initial response 
Trump was slow to address the spread of the disease, initially dismissing the threat and ignoring persistent public health warnings and calls for action from health officials within his administration and Secretary Azar. Throughout January and February he focused on economic and political considerations of the outbreak, and largely ignored the danger. By mid-March, most global financial markets had severely contracted in response to the emerging pandemic. Trump continued to claim that a vaccine was less than a year away, although HHS and Centers for Disease Control and Prevention (CDC) officials had repeatedly told him that vaccine development would take 12–18 months. Trump falsely claimed that "anybody that wants a test can get a test," despite the availability of tests being severely limited.

On March 6, Trump signed the Coronavirus Preparedness and Response Supplemental Appropriations Act into law, which provided $8.3 billion in emergency funding for federal agencies. On March 11, the World Health Organization (WHO) recognized the spread of COVID-19 as a pandemic, and Trump announced partial travel restrictions for most of Europe, effective March 13. That same day, he gave his first serious assessment of the virus in a nationwide Oval Office address, calling the outbreak "horrible" but "a temporary moment" and saying there was no financial crisis. On March 13, he declared a national emergency, freeing up federal resources.

In September 2019, the Trump administration terminated United States Agency for International Development's PREDICT program, a $200 million epidemiological research program initiated in 2009 to provide early warning of pandemics abroad. The program trained scientists in sixty foreign laboratories to detect and respond to viruses that have the potential to cause pandemics. One such laboratory was the Wuhan lab that first identified the virus that causes COVID-19. After revival in April 2020, the program was given two 6-month extensions to help fight COVID-19 in the U.S. and other countries.

On April 22, Trump signed an executive order restricting some forms of immigration to the United States. In late spring and early summer, with infections and death counts continuing to rise, he adopted a strategy of blaming the states for the growing pandemic, rather than accepting that his initial assessments of the course of the pandemic were overly-optimistic or his failure to provide presidential leadership.

White House Coronavirus Task Force 

Trump established the White House Coronavirus Task Force on January 29, 2020. Beginning in mid-March, Trump held a daily task force press conference, joined by medical experts and other administration officials, sometimes disagreeing with them by promoting unproven treatments. Trump was the main speaker at the briefings, where he praised his own response to the pandemic, frequently criticized rival presidential candidate Joe Biden, and denounced the press. On March 16, he acknowledged for the first time that the pandemic was not under control and that months of disruption to daily lives and a recession might occur. His repeated use of the terms "Chinese virus" and "China virus" to describe COVID-19 drew criticism from health experts.

By early April, as the pandemic worsened and amid criticism of his administration's response, Trump refused to admit any mistakes in his handling of the outbreak, instead blaming the media, Democratic state governors, the previous administration, China, and the World Health Organization (WHO). The daily coronavirus task force briefings ended in late April, after a briefing at which Trump suggested the dangerous idea of injecting a disinfectant to treat COVID-19; the comment was widely condemned by medical professionals.

In early May, Trump proposed the phase-out of the coronavirus task force and its replacement with another group centered on reopening the economy. Amid a backlash, Trump said the task force would "indefinitely" continue. By the end of May, the coronavirus task force's meetings were sharply reduced.

World Health Organization 
Prior to the pandemic, Trump criticized the World Health Organization (WHO) and other international bodies, which he asserted were taking advantage of U.S. aid. His administration's proposed 2021 federal budget, released in February, proposed reducing WHO funding by more than half. In May and April, Trump accused the WHO of "severely mismanaging and covering up the spread of the coronavirus" and alleged without evidence that the organization was under Chinese control and had enabled the Chinese government's concealment of the origins of the pandemic. He then announced that he was withdrawing funding for the organization. Trump's criticisms and actions regarding the WHO were seen as attempts to distract attention from his own mishandling of the pandemic. In July 2020, Trump announced the formal withdrawal of the United States from the WHO effective July 2021. The decision was widely condemned by health and government officials as "short-sighted", "senseless", and "dangerous".

Testing 

In June and July, Trump said several times that the U.S. would have fewer cases of coronavirus if it did less testing, that having a large number of reported cases "makes us look bad". The CDC guideline at the time was that any person exposed to the virus should be "quickly identified and tested" even if they are not showing symptoms, because asymptomatic people can still spread the virus. In August 2020 the CDC quietly lowered its recommendation for testing, advising that people who have been exposed to the virus, but are not showing symptoms, "do not necessarily need a test". The change in guidelines was made by HHS political appointees under Trump administration pressure, against the wishes of CDC scientists. The day after this political interference was reported, the testing guideline was changed back to its original recommendation, stressing that anyone who has been in contact with an infected person should be tested.

Pressure to abandon pandemic mitigation measures 
In April 2020, Republican-connected groups organized anti-lockdown protests against the measures state governments were taking to combat the pandemic; Trump encouraged the protests on Twitter, even though the targeted states did not meet the Trump administration's own guidelines for reopening. In April 2020, he first supported, then later criticized, Georgia Governor Brian Kemp's plan to reopen some nonessential businesses. Throughout the spring he increasingly pushed for ending the restrictions as a way to reverse the damage to the country's economy.

Trump often refused to wear a face mask at public events, contrary to his own administration's April 2020 guidance that Americans should wear masks in public and despite nearly unanimous medical consensus that masks are important to preventing the spread of the virus. By June, Trump had said masks were a "double-edged sword"; ridiculed Biden for wearing masks; continually emphasized that mask-wearing was optional; and suggested that wearing a mask was a political statement against him personally. Trump's contradiction of medical recommendations weakened national efforts to mitigate the pandemic.

Despite record numbers of COVID-19 cases in the U.S. from mid-June onward and an increasing percentage of positive test results, Trump largely continued to downplay the pandemic, including his false claim in early July 2020 that 99 percent of COVID-19 cases are "totally harmless". He also began insisting that all states should open schools to in-person education in the fall despite a July spike in reported cases.

Political pressure on health agencies 

Trump repeatedly pressured federal health agencies to take actions he favored, such as approving unproven treatments or speeding up the approval of vaccines. Trump administration political appointees at HHS sought to control CDC communications to the public that undermined Trump's claims that the pandemic was under control. CDC resisted many of the changes, but increasingly allowed HHS personnel to review articles and suggest changes before publication. Trump alleged without evidence that FDA scientists were part of a "deep state" opposing him, and delaying approval of vaccines and treatments to hurt him politically.

Outbreak at the White House 

On October 2, 2020, Trump tweeted that he had tested positive for COVID-19. His wife, their son Barron, and numerous staff members and visitors also became infected.

Later that day Trump was hospitalized at Walter Reed National Military Medical Center, reportedly due to labored breathing and a fever. He was treated with antiviral and experimental antibody drugs and a steroid. He returned to the White House on October 5, still struggling with the disease. During and after his treatment he continued to downplay the virus. In 2021, it was revealed that his condition had been far more serious; he had dangerously low blood oxygen levels, a high fever, and lung infiltrates, indicating a severe case of the disease.

Effects on the 2020 presidential campaign 
By July 2020, Trump's handling of the COVID-19 pandemic had become a major issue for the 2020 presidential election. Biden sought to make the pandemic the central issue of the election. Polls suggested voters blamed Trump for his pandemic response and disbelieved his rhetoric concerning the virus, with an Ipsos/ABC News poll indicating 65 percent of respondents disapproved of his pandemic response. In the final months of the campaign, Trump repeatedly claimed that the U.S. was "rounding the turn" in managing the pandemic, despite increasing numbers of reported cases and deaths. A few days before the November 3 election, the United States reported more than 100,000 cases in a single day for the first time.

Investigations 
After he assumed the presidency, Trump was the subject of increasing Justice Department and congressional scrutiny, with investigations covering his election campaign, transition, and inauguration, actions taken during his presidency, along with his private businesses, personal taxes, and charitable foundation. There were 30 investigations of Trump, including ten federal criminal investigations, eight state and local investigations, and twelve congressional investigations.

In April 2019, the House Oversight Committee issued subpoenas seeking financial details from Trump's banks, Deutsche Bank and Capital One, and his accounting firm, Mazars USA. Trump then sued the banks, Mazars, and committee chair Elijah Cummings to prevent the disclosures. In May, DC District Court judge Amit Mehta ruled that Mazars must comply with the subpoena, and judge Edgardo Ramos of the Southern District Court of New York ruled that the banks must also comply. Trump's attorneys appealed the rulings. In September 2022, the committee and Trump agreed to a settlement about Mazars, and the accounting firm began turning over documents.

Hush money payments 

During the 2016 presidential election campaign, American Media, Inc. (AMI), the parent company of the National Enquirer, and a company set up by Cohen paid Playboy model Karen McDougal and adult film actress Stormy Daniels for keeping silent about their alleged affairs with Trump between 2006 and 2007. Cohen pleaded guilty in 2018 to breaking campaign finance laws, saying he had arranged both payments at the direction of Trump to influence the presidential election. Trump denied the affairs and claimed he was not aware of Cohen's payment to Daniels, but he reimbursed him in 2017. Federal prosecutors asserted that Trump had been involved in discussions regarding non-disclosure payments as early as 2014. Court documents showed that the FBI believed Trump was directly involved in the payment to Daniels, based on calls he had with Cohen in October 2016. Federal prosecutors closed the investigation in 2019, but the Manhattan District Attorney subpoenaed the Trump Organization and AMI for records related to the payments and Trump and the Trump Organization for eight years of tax returns. In November 2022, The New York Times reported that Manhattan prosecutors were "newly optimistic about building a case" against Trump.

Russian election interference 

In January 2017, American intelligence agencies—the CIA, the FBI, and the NSA, represented by the Director of National Intelligence—jointly stated with "high confidence" that the Russian government interfered in the 2016 presidential election to favor the election of Trump. In March 2017, FBI Director James Comey told Congress "the FBI, as part of our counterintelligence mission, is investigating the Russian government's efforts to interfere in the 2016 presidential election. That includes investigating the nature of any links between individuals associated with the Trump campaign and the Russian government, and whether there was any coordination between the campaign and Russia's efforts."

Once discovered, the links between Trump associates and Russian officials were widely reported by the press. Manafort, one of Trump's campaign managers, worked from December 2004 to February 2010 to help pro-Russian politician Viktor Yanukovych win the Ukrainian presidency. Other Trump associates, including Flynn and Stone, were connected to Russian officials. Russian agents were overheard during the campaign saying they could use Manafort and Flynn to influence Trump. Members of Trump's campaign and later his White House staff, particularly Flynn, were in contact with Russian officials both before and after the November election. On December 29, 2016, Flynn talked with Russian Ambassador Sergey Kislyak about sanctions that were imposed that same day; Flynn later resigned in the midst of controversy over whether he misled Pence. Trump told Kislyak and Sergei Lavrov in May 2017 he was unconcerned about Russian interference in U.S. elections.

Trump and his allies promoted a conspiracy theory that Ukraine, rather than Russia, interfered in the 2016 election—which was also promoted by Russia to frame Ukraine. After the Democratic National Committee was hacked, Trump first claimed it withheld "its server" from the FBI (in actuality there were more than 140 servers, of which digital copies were given to the FBI); second, that CrowdStrike, the company that investigated the servers, was Ukraine-based and Ukrainian-owned (in actuality, CrowdStrike is U.S.-based, with the largest owners being American companies); and third that "the server" was hidden in Ukraine. Members of the Trump administration spoke out against the conspiracy theories.

FBI Crossfire Hurricane and 2017 counterintelligence investigations 
The Crossfire Hurricane FBI investigation into possible links between Russia and the Trump campaign was launched in July 2016 during the campaign season. After Trump fired FBI director James Comey in May 2017, the FBI opened a counterintelligence investigation into Trump's personal and business dealings with Russia. Crossfire Hurricane was folded into the Mueller investigation, but deputy attorney general Rod Rosenstein ended the other investigation while giving the bureau the false impression that Mueller would pursue it.

Special counsel investigation 

In May 2017, Deputy Attorney General Rod Rosenstein appointed Robert Mueller, a former director of the FBI, special counsel for the Department of Justice (DOJ) ordering him to "examine 'any links and/or coordination between the Russian government' and the Trump campaign." He privately told Mueller to restrict the investigation to criminal matters "in connection with Russia's 2016 election interference". The special counsel also investigated whether Trump's dismissal of James Comey as FBI director constituted obstruction of justice and the Trump campaign's possible ties to Saudi Arabia, the United Arab Emirates, Turkey, Qatar, Israel, and China. Trump sought to fire Mueller and shut down the investigation multiple times but backed down after his staff objected or after changing his mind.

In March 2019, Mueller concluded his investigation and gave his report to Attorney General William Barr. Two days later, Barr sent a letter to Congress purporting to summarize the report's main conclusions. A federal court, as well as Mueller himself, said Barr had mischaracterized the investigation's conclusions, confusing the public. Trump repeatedly and falsely claimed that the investigation exonerated him; the Mueller report expressly stated that it did not exonerate him.

A redacted version of the report was publicly released in April 2019. It found that Russia interfered in 2016 to favor Trump's candidacy and hinder Clinton's. Despite "numerous links between the Russian government and the Trump campaign", the prevailing evidence "did not establish" that Trump campaign members conspired or coordinated with Russian interference. The report revealed sweeping Russian interference and detailed how Trump and his campaign welcomed and encouraged it, believing "it would benefit electorally from information stolen and released through Russian efforts".

The report also detailed multiple acts of potential obstruction of justice by Trump, but did not make a "traditional prosecutorial judgment" on whether Trump broke the law, suggesting that Congress should make such a determination. Investigators decided they could not "apply an approach that could potentially result in a judgment that the President committed crimes" as an Office of Legal Counsel opinion stated that a sitting president could not be indicted, and investigators would not accuse him of a crime when he cannot clear his name in court. The report concluded that Congress, having the authority to take action against a president for wrongdoing, "may apply the obstruction laws". The House of Representatives subsequently launched an impeachment inquiry following the Trump–Ukraine scandal, but did not pursue an article of impeachment related to the Mueller investigation.

Several Trump associates pleaded guilty or were convicted in connection with Mueller's investigation and related cases, including Manafort, convicted on eight felony counts, deputy campaign manager Rick Gates, foreign policy advisor Papadopoulos, and Flynn. Cohen pleaded guilty to lying to Congress about Trump's 2016 attempts to reach a deal with Russia to build a Trump Tower in Moscow. Cohen said he had made the false statements on behalf of Trump, who was identified as "Individual-1" in the court documents. In February 2020, Stone was sentenced to 40 months in prison for lying to Congress and witness tampering regarding his attempts to learn more about hacked Democratic emails during the 2016 election. The sentencing judge said Stone "was prosecuted for covering up for the president".

First impeachment 

In August 2019, a whistleblower filed a complaint with the Inspector General of the Intelligence Community about a July 25 phone call between Trump and President of Ukraine Volodymyr Zelenskyy, during which Trump had pressured Zelenskyy to investigate CrowdStrike and Democratic presidential candidate Biden and his son Hunter, adding that the White House had attempted to cover-up the incident. The whistleblower stated that the call was part of a wider campaign by the Trump administration and Giuliani that may have included withholding financial aid from Ukraine in July 2019 and canceling Pence's May 2019 Ukraine trip.

House Speaker Nancy Pelosi initiated a formal impeachment inquiry on September 24. Trump then confirmed that he withheld military aid from Ukraine, offering contradictory reasons for the decision. On September 25, the Trump administration released a memorandum of the phone call which confirmed that, after Zelenskyy mentioned purchasing American anti-tank missiles, Trump asked him to discuss investigating Biden and his son with Giuliani and Barr. The testimony of multiple administration officials and former officials confirmed that this was part of a broader effort to further Trump's personal interests by giving him an advantage in the upcoming presidential election. In October, William B. Taylor Jr., the chargé d'affaires for Ukraine, testified before congressional committees that soon after arriving in Ukraine in June 2019, he found that Zelenskyy was being subjected to pressure directed by Trump and led by Giuliani. According to Taylor and others, the goal was to coerce Zelenskyy into making a public commitment investigating the company that employed Hunter Biden, as well as rumors about Ukrainian involvement in the 2016 U.S. presidential election. He said it was made clear that until Zelenskyy made such an announcement, the administration would not release scheduled military aid for Ukraine and not invite Zelenskyy to the White House.

On December 13, the House Judiciary Committee voted along party lines to pass two articles of impeachment: one for abuse of power and one for obstruction of Congress. After debate, the House of Representatives impeached Trump on both articles on December 18.

Impeachment trial in the Senate 

During the trial in January 2020, the House impeachment managers presented their case for three days. They cited evidence to support charges of abuse of power and obstruction of Congress, and asserted that Trump's actions were exactly what the founding fathers had in mind when they created the Constitution's impeachment process.
Responding over the next three days, Trump's lawyers did not deny the facts as presented in the charges but said Trump had not broken any laws or obstructed Congress. They argued that the impeachment was "constitutionally and legally invalid" because Trump was not charged with a crime and that abuse of power is not an impeachable offense.

On January 31, the Senate voted against allowing subpoenas for witnesses or documents; 51 Republicans formed the majority for this vote. The impeachment trial was the first in U.S. history without witness testimony.

Trump was acquitted of both charges by the Republican majority, 52–48 on abuse of power and 53–47 on obstruction of Congress. Senator Mitt Romney was the only Republican who voted to convict Trump on one charge, the abuse of power. 
Following his acquittal, Trump fired impeachment witnesses and other political appointees and career officials he deemed insufficiently loyal.

2020 presidential campaign 

Breaking with precedent, Trump filed to run for a second term with the FEC within a few hours of assuming the presidency. He held his first re-election rally less than a month after taking office and officially became the Republican nominee in August 2020.

In his first two years in office, Trump's reelection committee reported raising $67.5 million and began 2019 with $19.3 million in cash. By July 2020, the Trump campaign and the Republican Party had raised $1.1 billion and spent $800 million, losing their cash advantage over Biden. The cash shortage forced the campaign to scale back advertising spending.

Trump campaign advertisements focused on crime, claiming that cities would descend into lawlessness if Biden won the presidency. Trump repeatedly misrepresented Biden's positions and shifted to appeals to racism.

2020 presidential election 

Starting in spring 2020, Trump began to sow doubts about the election, claiming without evidence that the election would be rigged and that the expected widespread use of mail balloting would produce massive election fraud. In July, Trump raised the idea of delaying the election. When, in August, the House of Representatives voted for a $25 billion grant to the U.S. Postal Service for the expected surge in mail voting, Trump blocked funding, saying he wanted to prevent any increase in voting by mail. He repeatedly refused to say whether he would accept the results of the election and commit to a peaceful transition of power if he lost.

Biden won the election on November 3, receiving 81.3 million votes (51.3 percent) to Trump's 74.2 million (46.8 percent) and 306 Electoral College votes to Trump's 232.

False claims of voting fraud, attempt to prevent presidential transition 

At 2 a.m. the morning after the election, with the results still unclear, Trump declared victory. After Biden was projected the winner days later, Trump said, "this election is far from over" and baselessly alleged election fraud. Trump and his allies filed many legal challenges to the results, which were rejected by at least 86 judges in both the state and federal courts, including by federal judges appointed by Trump himself, finding no factual or legal basis. Trump's unsubstantiated allegations of widespread voting fraud were also refuted by state election officials. After Cybersecurity and Infrastructure Security Agency (CISA) director Chris Krebs contradicted Trump's fraud allegations, Trump dismissed him on November 17. On December 11, the U.S. Supreme Court declined to hear a case from the Texas attorney general that asked the court to overturn the election results in four states won by Biden.

Trump withdrew from public activities in the weeks following the election. He initially blocked government officials from cooperating in Biden's presidential transition. After three weeks, the administrator of the General Services Administration declared Biden the "apparent winner" of the election, allowing the disbursement of transition resources to his team. Trump still did not formally concede while claiming he recommended the GSA begin transition protocols.

The Electoral College formalized Biden's victory on December 14. From November to January, Trump repeatedly sought help to overturn the results of the election, personally pressuring various Republican local and state office-holders, Republican state and federal legislators, the Justice Department, and Vice President Pence, urging various actions such as replacing presidential electors, or a request for Georgia officials to "find" votes and announce a "recalculated" result. On February 10, 2021, Georgia prosecutors opened a criminal investigation into Trump's efforts to subvert the election in Georgia.

Trump did not attend Biden's inauguration, leaving Washington for Florida hours before.

Concern about a possible coup attempt or military action 
In December 2020, Newsweek reported the Pentagon was on red alert, and ranking officers had discussed what they would do if Trump decided to declare martial law. The Pentagon responded with quotes from defense leaders that the military has no role to play in the outcome of elections.

When Trump moved supporters into positions of power at the Pentagon after the November 2020 election, Chairman of the Joint Chiefs of Staff Mark Milley and CIA director Gina Haspel became concerned about the threat of a possible coup attempt or military action against China or Iran. Milley insisted that he should be consulted about any military orders from Trump, including the use of nuclear weapons, and he instructed Haspel and NSA director Paul Nakasone to monitor developments closely.

January 6 Capitol attack 

On January 6, 2021, while congressional certification of the presidential election results was taking place in the United States Capitol, Trump held a rally at the Ellipse, Washington, D.C., where he called for the election result to be overturned and urged his supporters to "take back our country" by marching to the Capitol to "show strength" and "fight like hell". Trump's speech started at noon. By 12:30p.m., rally attendees had gathered outside the Capitol, and at 1p.m., his supporters pushed past police barriers onto Capitol grounds. Trump's speech ended at 1:10p.m., and many supporters marched to the Capitol as he had urged, joining the crowd there. Around 2:15p.m. the mob broke into the building, disrupting certification and causing the evacuation of Congress. During the violence, Trump posted mixed messages on Twitter and Facebook, eventually tweeting to the rioters at 6p.m., "go home with love & in peace", but describing them as "great patriots" and "very special", while still complaining that the election was stolen. After the mob was removed from the Capitol, Congress reconvened and confirmed the Biden election win in the early hours of the following morning. There were many injuries, and five people, including a Capitol Police officer, died.

Second impeachment 

On January 11, 2021, an article of impeachment charging Trump with incitement of insurrection against the U.S. government was introduced to the House. The House voted 232–197 to impeach Trump on January 13, making him the first U.S. president to be impeached twice. The impeachment, which was the most rapid in history, followed an unsuccessful bipartisan effort to strip Trump of his powers and duties via Section 4 of the 25th Amendment. Ten Republicans voted for impeachment—the most members of a party ever to vote to impeach a president of their own party.

On February 13, following a five-day Senate trial, Trump was acquitted when the Senate voted 57–43 for conviction, falling ten votes short of the two-thirds majority required to convict; seven Republicans joined every Democrat in voting to convict, the most bipartisan support in any Senate impeachment trial of a president or former president. Most Republicans voted to acquit Trump, although some held him responsible but felt the Senate did not have jurisdiction over former presidents (Trump had left office on January 20; the Senate voted 56–44 the trial was constitutional). Included in the latter group was McConnell, who said Trump was "practically and morally responsible for provoking the events of the day", but "constitutionally not eligible for conviction".

Post-presidency (2021–present) 

At the end of his term, Trump went to live at his Mar-a-Lago club. As provided for by the Former Presidents Act, he established an office there to handle his post-presidential activities.

Trump's false claims concerning the 2020 election were commonly referred to as the "big lie" in the press and by his critics. In May 2021, Trump and his supporters attempted to co-opt the term, using it to refer to the election itself. The Republican Party used Trump's false election narrative to justify the imposition of new voting restrictions in its favor. As late as July 2022, Trump was still pressuring state legislators to overturn the 2020 election by rescinding the state's electoral votes for Biden.

Trump resumed his campaign-style rallies with an 85-minute speech at the annual North Carolina Republican Party convention on June 6, 2021. On June 26, he held his first public rally since the January 6 rally that preceded the riot at the Capitol.

Unlike other former presidents, Trump continued to dominate his party; he has been compared to a modern-day party boss. He continued fundraising, raising more than twice as much as the Republican Party itself, hinted at a third candidacy, and profited from fundraisers many Republican candidates held at Mar-a-Lago. Much of his focus was on the people in charge of elections and how elections are run. In the 2022 midterm elections he endorsed over 200 candidates for various offices, most of whom supported his false claim that the 2020 presidential election was stolen from him. Though there were exceptions, Trump's endorsement was seen as important for candidates in Republican primary elections.

Post-presidential investigations 
Trump is the subject of several probes into his business dealings and his actions both before and during the presidency. In February 2021, the district attorney for Fulton County, Georgia, Fani Willis, announced a criminal probe into Trump's phone calls to Georgia Secretary of State Brad Raffensperger. The New York State Attorney General's Office is conducting criminal investigations into Trump's business activities in conjunction with the Manhattan District Attorney's Office. By May 2021, a special grand jury was considering indictments. In July 2021, New York prosecutors charged the Trump Organization with a "15 year 'scheme to defraud' the government". The organization's chief financial officer, Allen Weisselberg, was arraigned on grand larceny, tax fraud, and other charges.

In December 2021, the New York State Attorney General's office subpoenaed Trump to produce documents related to the business. On April 25, 2022, New York state judge Arthur Engoron held Trump in contempt of court for failing to comply with the subpoena. He imposed a fine of $10,000 per day until he complies. Trump was deposed in August and invoked his Fifth Amendment right against self-incrimination more than 400 times. In September 2022, the Attorney General of New York filed a civil fraud case against Trump, his three oldest children, and the Trump Organization.

FBI investigations 

When Trump left the White House in January 2021, he took government documents and material with him to Mar-a-Lago. By May 2021, the National Archives and Records Administration (NARA), the federal agency that preserves government records, realized that important documents had not been turned over to them at the end of Trump's term and asked his office to locate them. In January 2022, they retrieved 15 boxes of White House records from Mar-a-Lago. NARA later informed the Department of Justice that some of the retrieved documents were classified material. The Justice Department began an investigation in April 2022 and convened a grand jury. The Justice Department sent Trump a subpoena for additional material on May 11. On June 3, Justice Department officials visited Mar-a-Lago and received some classified documents from Trump's lawyers. One of the lawyers signed a statement affirming that all material marked as classified had been returned to the government. Later that month an additional subpoena was sent requesting surveillance footage from Mar-a-Lago, which was provided.

On August 8, 2022, FBI agents searched Trump's residence, office, and storage areas at Mar-a-Lago to recover government documents and material Trump had taken with him when he left office in violation of the Presidential Records Act, reportedly including some related to nuclear weapons. The search warrant, authorized by U.S. Attorney General Merrick Garland and approved by a federal magistrate judge, and the written inventory of the seized items were made public on August 12. The text of the search warrant indicates an investigation of potential violations of the Espionage Act and obstruction of justice laws. The items taken in the search included 11 sets of classified documents, four of them tagged as "top secret" and one as "top secret/SCI", the highest level of classification.

On November 18, 2022, Garland appointed a special counsel, federal prosecutor Jack Smith, to oversee the federal criminal investigations into Trump retaining government property at Mar-a-Lago and examining Trump's role in the events leading up to the January 6, 2021, Capitol attack.

Criminal referral by the House January 6 Committee

On December 19, 2022, the United States House Select Committee on the January 6 Attack recommended criminal charges against Trump for obstructing an official proceeding, conspiracy to defraud the United States, and inciting or assisting an insurrection.

2024 presidential campaign 

On November 15, 2022, Trump announced his candidacy for the 2024 United States presidential election and set up a fundraising account.

Public profile

Approval ratings and scholar surveys 

Trump was the only president to never reach a 50% approval rating in the Gallup poll dating to 1938. The approval ratings showed a record-high partisan gap: 88 percent among Republicans, 7 percent among Democrats. Until September 2020, the ratings were unusually stable, reaching a high of 49 percent and a low of 35 percent. Trump finished his term with a record-low approval rating of between 29 percent and 34 percent (the lowest of any president since modern polling began) and a record-low average of 41 percent throughout his presidency.

In Gallup's annual poll asking Americans to name the man they admire the most, Trump placed second to Obama in 2017 and 2018, tied with Obama for most admired man in 2019, and was named most admired in 2020. Since Gallup started conducting the poll in 1948, Trump is the first elected president not to be named most admired in his first year in office.

A Gallup poll in 134 countries comparing the approval ratings of U.S. leadership between the years 2016 and 2017 found that Trump led Obama in job approval in only 29, most of them non-democracies, with approval of U.S. leadership plummeting among allies and G7 countries. Overall ratings were similar to those in the last two years of the George W. Bush presidency. By mid-2020, only 16% of international respondents to a 13-nation Pew Research poll expressed confidence in Trump, a lower score than those historically accorded to Russia's Vladimir Putin and China's Xi Jinping.

C-SPAN, which has surveyed presidential historians on presidential leadership each time the administration changed since 2000, ranked Trump fourth–lowest overall in their Presidential Historians Survey 2021, with Trump rated lowest in the leadership characteristics categories for moral authority and administrative skills. The Siena College Research Institute (SCRI) has surveyed presidential scholars during the second year of the first term of each president since 1982. For the second time, SCRI ranked Trump third-lowest overall. He was ranked last on background, integrity, intelligence, foreign policy accomplishments, and executive appointments, and second to last on ability to compromise, executive ability, and present overall view. He was ranked near the bottom in all categories except for luck, willingness to take risks, and party leadership.

Social media 

Trump's social media presence attracted worldwide attention after he joined Twitter in 2009. He tweeted frequently during the 2016 election campaign and as president until Twitter banned him in the final days of his term. Over twelve years, Trump posted around 57,000 tweets, often using Twitter as a direct means of communication with the public and sidelining the press. In June 2017, a White House press secretary said that Trump's tweets were official presidential statements. Trump often announced terminations of administration officials and cabinet members over Twitter.

After years of criticism for allowing Trump to post misinformation and falsehoods, Twitter began to tag some of his tweets with fact-checking warnings in May 2020. In response, Trump tweeted that "Social Media Platforms totally silence conservatives  voices" and that he would "strongly regulate, or close them down". In the days after the storming of the United States Capitol, Trump was banned from Facebook, Instagram, Twitter and other platforms. The loss of Trump's social media presence, including his 88.7 million Twitter followers, diminished his ability to shape events, and prompted a dramatic decrease in the volume of misinformation shared on Twitter. Trump's early attempts to re-establish a social media presence were unsuccessful.  In February 2022, he launched social media platform Truth Social, where he only attracted a fraction of his earlier following.

On November 19, 2022, Twitter owner Elon Musk reinstated Trump's account. Trump had said that he would stay on Truth Social.

Relationship with the press 

Trump sought media attention throughout his career, sustaining a "love–hate" relationship with the press. In the 2016 campaign, Trump benefited from a record amount of free media coverage, elevating his standing in the Republican primaries. The New York Times writer Amy Chozick wrote in 2018 that Trump's media dominance enthralled the public and created "must-see TV."

As a candidate and as president, Trump frequently accused the press of bias, calling it the "fake news media" and "the enemy of the people". In 2018, journalist Lesley Stahl recounted Trump's saying he intentionally demeaned and discredited the media "so when you write negative stories about me no one will believe you".

As president, Trump privately and publicly mused about revoking the press credentials of journalists he viewed as critical. His administration moved to revoke the press passes of two White House reporters, which were restored by the courts. In 2019, a member of the foreign press reported many of the same concerns as those of media in the U.S., expressing concern that a normalization process by reporters and media results in an inaccurate characterization of Trump. The Trump White House held about a hundred formal press briefings in 2017, declining by half during 2018 and to two in 2019.

Trump also deployed the legal system to intimidate the press. In early 2020, the Trump campaign sued The New York Times, The Washington Post, and CNN for defamation in opinion pieces about Russian election interference. Legal experts said that the lawsuits lacked merit and were not likely to succeed. By March 2021, the lawsuits against The New York Times and CNN had been dismissed.

False statements 

As a candidate and as president, Trump frequently made false statements in public speeches and remarks to an extent unprecedented in American politics. His falsehoods became a distinctive part of his political identity.

Trump's false and misleading statements were documented by fact-checkers, including at The Washington Post, which tallied a total of 30,573 false or misleading statements made by Trump over his four-year term. Trump's falsehoods increased in frequency over time, rising from about 6 false or misleading claims per day in his first year as president to 16 per day in his second year, 22 per day in his third year, and 39 per day in his final year. He reached 10,000 false or misleading claims 27 months into his term; 20,000 false or misleading claims 14 months later, and 30,000 false or misleading claims five months later.

Some of Trump's falsehoods were inconsequential, such as his claim of the "biggest inaugural crowd ever". Others had more far-reaching effects, such as Trump's promotion of unproven antimalarial drugs as a treatment for COVID-19 in a press conference and on Twitter in March 2020. The claims had consequences worldwide, such as a shortage of these drugs in the United States and panic-buying in Africa and South Asia. Other misinformation, such as misattributing a rise in crime in England and Wales to the "spread of radical Islamic terror", served Trump's domestic political purposes. As a matter of principle, Trump does not apologize for his falsehoods.

Despite the frequency of Trump's falsehoods, the media rarely referred to them as lies. The first time The Washington Post did so was in August 2018, when it declared that some of Trump's misstatements, in particular those concerning hush money paid to Stormy Daniels and Playboy model Karen McDougal, were lies.

In 2020, Trump was a significant source of disinformation on mail-in voting and misinformation on the COVID-19 pandemic. His attacks on mail-in ballots and other election practices served to weaken public faith in the integrity of the 2020 presidential election, while his disinformation about the pandemic delayed and weakened the national response to it.

James Pfiffner, professor of policy and government at George Mason University, wrote in 2019 that Trump lies differently from previous presidents, because he offers "egregious false statements that are demonstrably contrary to well-known facts"; these lies are the "most important" of all Trump lies. By calling facts into question, people will be unable to properly evaluate their government, with beliefs or policy irrationally settled by "political power"; this erodes liberal democracy, wrote Pfiffner.

Promotion of conspiracy theories 

Before and throughout his presidency, Trump has promoted numerous conspiracy theories, including Obama birtherism, the Clinton body count conspiracy theory, QAnon, the Global warming hoax theory, Trump Tower wiretapping allegations, a John F. Kennedy assassination conspiracy theory involving Rafael Cruz, linking talk show host Joe Scarborough to the death of a staffer, alleged foul-play in the death of Justice Antonin Scalia, alleged Ukrainian interference in U.S. elections, and that Osama bin Laden was alive and Obama and Biden had members of Navy SEAL Team 6 killed. In at least two instances, Trump clarified to press that he also believed the conspiracy theory in question.

During and since the 2020 presidential election, Trump has promoted various conspiracy theories for his defeat including dead people voting, voting machines changing or deleting Trump votes, fraudulent mail-in voting, throwing out Trump votes, and "finding" suitcases full of Biden votes.

Racial views 

Many of Trump's comments and actions have been considered racist. In national polling, about half of respondents said that Trump is racist; a greater proportion believed that he has emboldened racists. Several studies and surveys found that racist attitudes fueled Trump's political ascent and were more important than economic factors in determining the allegiance of Trump voters. Racist and Islamophobic attitudes are a powerful indicator of support for Trump.

In 1975, he settled a 1973 Department of Justice lawsuit that alleged housing discrimination against black renters. He has also been accused of racism for insisting a group of black and Latino teenagers were guilty of raping a white woman in the 1989 Central Park jogger case, even after they were exonerated by DNA evidence in 2002. As of 2019, he maintained this position.

In 2011, when he was reportedly considering a presidential run, he became the leading proponent of the racist "birther" conspiracy theory alleging that Barack Obama, the first black U.S. president, was not born in the United States. In April, he claimed credit for pressuring the White House to publish the "long-form" birth certificate, which he considered fraudulent, and later said this made him "very popular". In September 2016, amid pressure, he acknowledged that Obama was born in the U.S. In 2017, he reportedly expressed birther views in private.

According to an analysis in Political Science Quarterly, Trump made "explicitly racist appeals to whites" during his 2016 presidential campaign. In particular, his campaign launch speech drew widespread criticism for claiming Mexican immigrants were "bringing drugs, they're bringing crime, they're rapists". His later comments about a Mexican-American judge presiding over a civil suit regarding Trump University were also criticized as racist.

Trump's comments on the 2017 far-right rally in Charlottesville, Virginia, condemning "this egregious display of hatred, bigotry and violence on many sides" and stating that there were "very fine people on both sides", were widely criticized as implying a moral equivalence between the white supremacist demonstrators and the counter-protesters.

In a January 2018 Oval Office meeting to discuss immigration legislation, Trump reportedly referred to El Salvador, Haiti, Honduras, and African nations as "shithole countries". His remarks were condemned as racist.

In July 2019, Trump tweeted that four Democratic congresswomen—all minorities, three of whom are native-born Americans—should "go back" to the countries they "came from". Two days later the House of Representatives voted 240–187, mostly along party lines, to condemn his "racist comments". White nationalist publications and social media sites praised his remarks, which continued over the following days. Trump continued to make similar remarks during his 2020 campaign.

Misogyny and allegations of sexual misconduct 

Trump has a history of insulting and belittling women when speaking to media and on social media. He made lewd comments, demeaned women's looks, and called them names, such as 'dog', 'crazed, 'crying lowlife', 'face of a pig', or 'horseface'.

In October 2016, two days before the second presidential debate, a 2005 "hot mic" recording surfaced in which Trump is heard bragging about kissing and groping women without their consent, saying "when you're a star, they let you do it, you can do anything... grab 'em by the pussy." The incident's widespread media exposure led to Trump's first public apology during the campaign and caused outrage across the political spectrum.

At least 26 women have publicly accused Trump of rape, kissing and groping without consent, looking under women's skirts, or walking in on naked teenage pageant contestants. In 2016, he denied all accusations, calling them "false smears" and alleging a conspiracy against him and the American people.

Incitement of violence 

Research suggests Trump's rhetoric caused an increased incidence of hate crimes. During his 2016 campaign, he urged or praised physical attacks against protesters or reporters. Numerous defendants investigated or prosecuted for violent acts and hate crimes, including participants of the January 6, 2021, storming of the U.S. Capitol, cited Trump's rhetoric in arguing that they were not culpable or should receive a lighter sentence. A nationwide review by ABC News in May 2020 identified at least 54 criminal cases from August 2015 to April 2020 in which Trump was invoked in direct connection with violence or threats of violence mostly by white men and primarily against members of minority groups.

Popular culture 

Trump has been the subject of parody, comedy, and caricature on television, in films, and in comics. Trump was named in hundreds of hip hop songs since the 1980s, mostly positive. Mentions turned largely negative and pejorative after he began running for office in 2015.

Notes

References

Works cited

External links

 Archive of Donald Trump's Tweets  
 
 
 Donald Trump on the Internet Archive
 Donald Trump's page on WhiteHouse.gov

 
1946 births
Living people

20th-century American businesspeople
20th-century American politicians
21st-century American politicians
21st-century American businesspeople
21st-century presidents of the United States
American billionaires
American casino industry businesspeople
American chairpersons of corporations
American computer businesspeople
American conspiracy theorists
American hoteliers
American Internet company founders
American nationalists
American people of German descent
American people of Scottish descent
American real estate businesspeople
American reality television producers
American television hosts
Articles containing video clips
Businesspeople from Queens, New York
Candidates in the 2000 United States presidential election
Candidates in the 2016 United States presidential election
Candidates in the 2020 United States presidential election
Candidates in the 2024 United States presidential election
Florida Republicans
Impeached presidents of the United States
New York Military Academy alumni
New York (state) Democrats
New York (state) Independents
New York (state) Republicans
People associated with Russian interference in the 2016 United States elections
People stripped of honorary degrees
Politicians from Queens, New York
Presidents of the United States
Reform Party of the United States of America politicians
Republican Party (United States) presidential nominees
Republican Party presidents of the United States
Right-wing populism in the United States
Television personalities from Queens, New York
Television producers from Queens, New York
Time Person of the Year
The Trump Organization employees
Donald
United States Football League executives
Wharton School of the University of Pennsylvania alumni
WWE Hall of Fame inductees